Lars Flora (born January 6, 1978) is an American cross-country skier. He competed at the 2002 Winter Olympics and the 2006 Winter Olympics.

References

External links
 

1978 births
Living people
American male cross-country skiers
Olympic cross-country skiers of the United States
Cross-country skiers at the 2002 Winter Olympics
Cross-country skiers at the 2006 Winter Olympics
Sportspeople from Portland, Oregon
21st-century American people